Cliodynamics: The Journal of Quantitative History and Cultural Evolution is a peer-reviewed open access scholarly journal publishing original articles advancing the state of theoretical knowledge in the transdisciplinary area of cliodynamics. It is an initiative of The Institute for Research on World-Systems at the University of California, Riverside. The current editor-in-chief is Peter Turchin.

Abstracting and indexing 
The journal is abstracted and indexed in:

References

External links 
 

Creative Commons Attribution-licensed journals
Publications established in 2010
English-language journals
Cultural journals
University of California, Riverside